The Southern Aslian languages are a sub-branch of the Aslian branch of the Austroasiatic language family. They have also been referred to as the Semelaic languages, but this label is no longer used. The four languages that make up the branch are: 
Semelai, Semaq Beri, Mah Meri (Betise’), and Temoq .

These languages are spoken by no more than 10,000 speakers in total. The languages are considered endangered due to social disruption in the area and the dominance of Malay.

References

External links
Mon–Khmer languages at SEAlang
Mon–Khmer.com: Lectures by Paul Sidwell
http://projekt.ht.lu.se/rwaai RWAAI (Repository and Workspace for Austroasiatic Intangible Heritage)
http://hdl.handle.net/10050/00-0000-0000-0003-66DD-5@view Southern Aslian languages in RWAAI Digital Archive

Languages of Malaysia